The 2020 European Open was a men's tennis tournament played on indoor hard courts. It was the fifth edition of the European Open and part of the ATP Tour 250 series of the 2020 ATP Tour. It took place at the Lotto Arena in Antwerp, Belgium, from October 19 to October 25.

Singles main-draw entrants

Seeds

 Rankings are as of 12 October 2020.

Other entrants
The following players received wildcards into the singles main draw:
  Zizou Bergs
  Kimmer Coppejans
  Luca Nardi

The following players received entry from the qualifying draw:
  Salvatore Caruso
  Marcos Giron
  Lloyd Harris
  Emil Ruusuvuori

The following player received entry as a lucky loser:
  Federico Coria

Withdrawals
  Nikoloz Basilashvili → replaced by  Richard Gasquet
  Matteo Berrettini → replaced by  Aljaž Bedene
  Kei Nishikori → replaced by  Federico Coria
  Fabio Fognini → replaced by  Feliciano López
  Cristian Garín → replaced by  Pablo Andújar
  Andrey Rublev → replaced by  Frances Tiafoe
  Casper Ruud → replaced by  Tommy Paul

Doubles main-draw entrants

Seeds

 Rankings are as of 12 October 2020

Other entrants
The following pairs received wildcards into the doubles main draw:
  Michael Geerts /  Yannick Mertens 
  Zane Khan /  Luca Nardi

The following pairs received entry as an alternates:
  Alex de Minaur /  Matt Reid
  Pablo Andújar /  Sander Arends

Withdrawals
Before the tournament
  Juan Sebastián Cabal
  Kei Nishikori

Finals

Singles 

  Ugo Humbert def.  Alex de Minaur, 6–1, 7–6(7–4)

Doubles 

  John Peers /  Michael Venus def.  Rohan Bopanna /  Matwé Middelkoop, 6–3, 6–4

References

External links 
 

2020
European Open
European Open
European Open